Destination is the first album of J-pop duo FictionJunction Yuuka. It was released on November 23, 2005.

This album includes their first three singles and their b-sides, as well as five brand-new songs. There are two versions of this album: the normal edition (with catalog number VICL-61792) and the limited edition. The limited edition, with the catalog number VIZL-159, includes a DVD with the PV of Honoh no Tobira, its making of and a commercial for the single (15 seconds and 30 seconds).

The album, at its peak, ranked ninth on the Oricon charts.

Track listings

CD

Track listing

DVD

External links
Victor Animation Network: discography entry

References and notes

2005 albums
Victor Entertainment albums